Frankfurt-Zeilsheim station is a railway station located in the Sindlingen district of Frankfurt, Germany, on the Main-Lahn Railway. It is served by line S2 of the Rhine-Main S-Bahn. The station opened on 13 May 2007 and is classified by Deutsche Bahn as a category 5 station.

Name and location

The station is located on an embankment of the Main-Lahn Railway (Main-Lahn-Bahn), which marks the border between the districts of Sindlingen and Zeilsheim. Thus, the platform serving trains towards the inner city and Dietzenbach is in Sindlingen, while the platform serving trains towards Niedernhausen is in Zeilsheim.

Two streets, Sindlinger Bahnstraße to the north and West-Höchster-Straße to the south, pass through an underpass to the east of the station. There are entrances from here to each platform, in both cases via a staircase and a ramp. A pedestrian underpass was built to provide a western entrance connecting to the Ferdinand-Hofmann estate and the Internationale Schule Frankfurt Rhein-Main in Sindlingen.

Although the station is in the Frankfurt district of Sindlingen and not in the Zeilsheim district, it was named after Zeilsheim because Frankfurt Sindlingen station already existed. The name Frankfurt Sindlingen North station was rejected by Deutsche Bahn.

The station cost €6.75 million to build, funded by the city of Frankfurt, Hesse and the Rhein-Main-Verkehrsverbund (Rhine-Main Transport Association, RMV).

History

The communities of Zeilsheim and Sindlingen were incorporated into Höchst am Main, which in turn became part of Frankfurt in 1928. A commitment to construct a station between Zeilsheim and Sindlingen was part of the annexation agreement between Frankfurt and Höchst am Main.

The Frankfurt City Council authorised the preliminary planning for the construction of the station on 29 April 1999 after several years of preparatory work. Construction of the project started in January 2006. Originally, it was planned to open Zeilsheim station at the timetable change of 10 December 2006, but significant delays and mishaps during the construction led the opening to be postponed to the spring of 2007. It was eventually opened on 13 May 2007. Thus the terms of the annexation agreement of 1928 were fulfilled after 79 years.

Operations

The station is served by S-Bahn line S2, which runs between Niedernhausen and Dietzenbach. It operates on weekdays at 30-minute intervals, at 15-minute intervals during peak hours and hourly on weekends.

The station is classified as category 5 station.

Buses
In order to improve connections to the station, the entire bus network in the western part of Frankfurt was revised at the timetable change in December 2006. The adjacent bus stop is served by city bus lines 53 (to/from Bolongaro Palace in Höchst), 54 (Griesheim station) and 57 (Siedlung Taunusblick), which connect the station to centre of the district. Zeilsheim station is also served by the night bus line N8.

References

External links

Rhine-Main S-Bahn stations
Railway stations in Frankfurt
Railway stations in Germany opened in 2007